is a Japanese long-distance runner. He competed in the men's marathon at the 2000 Summer Olympics.

References

1972 births
Living people
Athletes (track and field) at the 2000 Summer Olympics
Japanese male long-distance runners
Japanese male marathon runners
Olympic athletes of Japan
Sportspeople from Tokushima Prefecture